Notagonum is a genus of beetles in the family Carabidae, containing the following species:

 Notagonum addendum Darlington, 1952
 Notagonum aitape Darlington, 1952
 Notagonum albertisi (Maindron, 1906)
 Notagonum altum Darlington, 1952
 Notagonum ambulator Darlington, 1971
 Notagonum anceps (Jedlicka, 1934)
 Notagonum angulum Darlington, 1952
 Notagonum angustellum Darlington, 1952
 Notagonum anops (Jedlicka, 1934)
 Notagonum astrum Darlington, 1971
 Notagonum caritum Darlington, 1970
 Notagonum chathamense (Broun, 1909)
 Notagonum circumdatum (Andrewes, 1930)
 Notagonum crenulipenne Baehr, 2010
 Notagonum curiosum Darlington, 1971
 Notagonum darlingtoni Baehr, 2010
 Notagonum delaruei Liebherr, 2005
 Notagonum dentellum Darlington, 1952
 Notagonum devosi Baehr, 2010
 Notagonum drescheri Louwerens, 1956
 Notagonum exactum Darlington, 1971
 Notagonum excisipenne Baehr, 2010
 Notagonum externum Darlington, 1952
 Notagonum feredayi (Bates, 1874)
 Notagonum fuscipes Baehr, 2010
 Notagonum garainae Baehr, 2010
 Notagonum gibbum Darlington, 1952
 Notagonum gorokae Baehr, 2010
 Notagonum hamatum Baehr, 2010
 Notagonum ilagae Baehr, 2010
 Notagonum inerme (Andrewes, 1937)
 Notagonum iridius Darlington, 1952
 Notagonum kitchingi Baehr, 2010
 Notagonum lackneri Baehr, 2010
 Notagonum lafertei (Montrouzier, 1860)
 Notagonum laglaizei (Maindron, 1908)
 Notagonum laticolle Baehr, 2010
 Notagonum lawsoni (Bates, 1874)
 Notagonum luzonense (Jedlicka, 1935)
 Notagonum macleayi (Sloane, 1910)
 Notagonum macrophthalmum Baehr, 2010
 Notagonum macrops (Louwerens, 1955)
 Notagonum malkini Darlington, 1952
 Notagonum margaritum Darlington, 1952
 Notagonum marginale Baehr, 2010
 Notagonum marginellum (Erichson, 1842)
 Notagonum moluccense Louwerens, 1956
 Notagonum mucidum (Jedlicka, 1934)
 Notagonum murrayense (Blackburn, 1890)
 Notagonum nigrellum Darlington, 1956
 Notagonum nigrinum Baehr, 2010
 Notagonum novaeguineae (Maindron, 1908)
 Notagonum oxypterum Louwerens, 1955
 Notagonum paludum Darlington, 1952
 Notagonum parvicolle Baehr, 2010
 Notagonum pereus (Jedlicka, 1934)
 Notagonum piceum Louwerens, 1962
 Notagonum pleurale (Jordan, 1894)
 Notagonum quadruum Darlington, 1971
 Notagonum reversior Darlington, 1952
 Notagonum reversum Darlington, 1952
 Notagonum rugifoveatum Louwerens, 1955
 Notagonum schuelei Baehr, 2010
 Notagonum sectum Darlington, 1971
 Notagonum sigi Darlington, 1952
 Notagonum sinuum Darlington, 1952
 Notagonum skalei Baehr, 2010
 Notagonum spinulum Darlington, 1952
 Notagonum subangulum Darlington, 1952
 Notagonum subimpressum Darlington, 1952
 Notagonum submetallicum (White, 1846)
 Notagonum subnigrum Darlington, 1952
 Notagonum subpunctum Darlington, 1952
 Notagonum subrufum Darlington, 1952
 Notagonum subspinulum Darlington, 1952
 Notagonum ullrichi Baehr, 2010
 Notagonum undatum (Andrewes, 1937)
 Notagonum vaporum Darlington, 1952
 Notagonum vile Darlington, 1952
 Notagonum weigeli Baehr, 2007

References

 
Platyninae